Chrząstowo may refer to the following places:
Chrząstowo, Greater Poland Voivodeship (west-central Poland)
Chrząstowo, Inowrocław County in Kuyavian-Pomeranian Voivodeship (north-central Poland)
Chrząstowo, Nakło County in Kuyavian-Pomeranian Voivodeship (north-central Poland)
Chrząstowo, Pomeranian Voivodeship (north Poland)
Chrząstowo, West Pomeranian Voivodeship (north-west Poland)